The Shakey's V-League 12th Season Collegiate Conference was the 23rd conference of Shakey's V-League. The opening ceremony was held on July 11, 2015  with the first triple header of volleyball games at the Filoil Flying V Arena in San Juan, Metro Manila. There were twelve (12) competing teams for this conference.

Tournament Format

Preliminaries (PL)
 Twelve (12) participating teams will be divided into two (2) PL groups - Group A & Group B.
 Each pool will play a single round robin.
 The TOP 4 TEAMS PER POOL (or a total of eight (8) teams) will advance to the Quarterfinal Round.
 The bottom two (2) per group will be eliminated from the tournament.

Quarterfinals (QF)
 The eight (8) quarter finalists will be regrouped into one pool.
 The top four (4) teams after a single round robin will advance to the semi-finals round.

Semi-finals (SF)
 The four (4) semi-finalists will compete against each other in a best-of-three series as follows: Rank 1 vs Rank 4 and Rank 2 vs Rank 3.
 Top two (2) SF teams will compete for GOLD.
 Bottom two (2) SF teams will compete for BRONZE.

Finals
The battle for GOLD and the battle for BRONZE will both follow the best-of-three format, provided:
 If the battle for GOLD ends in two (2) matches (2-0), then there will no longer be a Game 3 for either GOLD or Bronze. A tie in BRONZE (1-1) will be resolve using FIVB rules.
 A tie in the series for GOLD (1-1) after Game 2 will be broken in a Game 3, regardless of the result of the series in BRONZE.

Participating teams

Conference Line-up

Group A

Group B

Preliminaries

Group A

|}

Match Results

|}

Group B

|}

Match Results

|}

Quarterfinals

|}

Match Results

|}

Semifinals
 Ranking is based from the quarter finals round.
 All series are best-of-3

Rank 1 vs Rank 4

|}
 Ateneo de Manila University advances to the final round.

Rank 2 vs Rank 3

|}
 National University advances to the final round.
 Far Eastern University & University of Santo Tomas will compete for the 3rd place (BRONZE).

Finals

Battle for Bronze

Battle for Gold

Awards

Most Valuable Player (Finals)
  Myla Pablo
Most Valuable Player (Conference)
  Alyssa Valdez
 Best Setter
  Gizelle Tan
Best  Outside Spikers
  Alyssa Valdez
  Ennajie Laure

Best Middle Blockers
  Alyja Daphne Santiago
  Bea de Leon
Best Opposite Spiker
  Jovelyn Gonzaga
Best Libero
  Fatima Bia General

Final standings

 Note: 
 (G) - Guest Player
 ((c)) - Team Captain
 (L) - Libero

External links
 www.v-league.ph - Official website
 www.twitter.com/vleague_ph - Official Twitter

See also
 Spikers' Turf 1st Season Collegiate Conference
 Shakey's V-League conference results

References

Shakey's V-League conferences
2015 in Philippine sport